Baleleng is one of the famous Filipino folk song which is Sama Dilaut and/or Tausug in origin that has been passed through generations.  The composer or the writer of the song was not credited and was unknown. The tune was passed by mouth from province to province and the original lyrics of the song was altered. Versions of Filipino local artists have made the song popular both in Visayan and Tagalog languages.

Leleng was the original title of the song which means Darling, Sweetheart, my lady or my dear in Sama Dilaut language. In Philippine languages such as Visayan and Tagalog, the enclitic "ba" is used as a question marker. Example: (Tagalog) Aalis ka na ba?  (English) ɑre you leaving now? Since the song was passed from tongue to tongue, the lyrics was wrongly interpreted as Baleleng.

The story of the song was about a man bidding goodbye to a lady called Leleng as he was going to war. Like other Sama Dilaut songs, it is sang with the accompaniment of a string instrument like gitgit and biula, gabbang and the kulintangan.

In popular culture

The folk song was used as an ending theme in the Philippine television drama Sahaya broadcast by GMA Network starring Bianca Umali in the title role, a Badjao from Zamboanga who despite her struggles in life stay true to her identity.

References 

Philippine folk songs